Xinxianglu Subdistrict is a Subdistrict in Xiangxiang City, Hunan Province, People's Republic of China.

Cityscape
The township is divided into five villages and seven communities, the following areas: Beizhengjie Community, Honglun Community, Xingang Community, Xianglvzerenyouxiangongsi Community, Haotang Community, Meiping Community, Changqiao Community, Chengxi Village, Baituo Village, Xiangxiangchachang Village, Xiangxiangyuanyichang Village, and Xiangxiangxumuchang Village (北正街社区、红仑社区、新港社区、湖南湘铝有限责任公司社区、壕塘社区、梅坪社区、长桥社区、城西村、白托村、湘乡茶场村、湘乡园艺场村、湘乡畜牧场村).

References

External links

Divisions of Xiangxiang